Barbara Gardner (born January 19, 1941) is an American Democratic politician from Holliston, Massachusetts. She represented the 8th Middlesex district in the Massachusetts House of Representatives from 1986 to 2001.

Gardner was born on January 19, 1941, in Rochester, New York and received her B.A. from Framingham State College.

See also
 1985-1986 Massachusetts legislature
 1987-1988 Massachusetts legislature
 1989-1990 Massachusetts legislature
 1991-1992 Massachusetts legislature
 1993-1994 Massachusetts legislature
 1995-1996 Massachusetts legislature
 1997-1998 Massachusetts legislature
 1999-2000 Massachusetts legislature

References

Year of death missing
Members of the Massachusetts House of Representatives
Women state legislators in Massachusetts
20th-century American women politicians
20th-century American politicians
People from Holliston, Massachusetts
1941 births
Framingham State University alumni